The Walser people are descendants of people who migrated from the Wallis, Switzerland, to other Alpine regions. The Highest Alemannic Walser German dialects are still very similar to Walliser German

People
Al Walser (born 1976), German-born Liechtensteiner singer, songwriter, and record producer
Alissa Walser (born 1961), German writer and artist; daughter of Martin Walser
Andreas Walser (1908–1930), Swiss painter
David Walser (1923–1993), British Anglican rector and archdeacon 
Derrick Walser (born 1978), Canadian ice hockey player and coach
Don Walser (1934–2006), American singer-songwriter and musician
Emma Shannon Walser (born 1929), Liberian lawyer and jurist 
Frank Walser (1924–1996), American builder
Franziska Walser (born 1950), German actor; daughter of Martin Walser
George Walser (1834–1910), American lawyer and politician
Helmut Walser Smith (born 1962), German history professor
Hugo Walser (1940–2005), Liechtensteiner runner
Hugo Walser (field hockey) (1948), Swiss field hockey player
Karl Walser (1877–1943), Swiss painter, stage designer, illustrator, and muralist
Martin Walser (born 1927), German writer
Robert Walser (musicologist) (born ?), American musicologist, writer, and educator
Robert Walser (writer), (1878–1956), German-speaking Swiss writer
Samuel Walser (born 1992), Swiss ice hockey player
Ulrich and Anton Walser ( late 19th-cent.), Swiss-born American builders
Zeb V. Walser (1866–1940), American attorney and politician

See also
Walter (disambiguation)
Waltzer (surname)
Walzer (surname)
Wälzer (surname)

Ethnonymic surnames
Surnames of Swiss origin